Nethy Bridge ( or ) is a small village in Strathspey in the Highland council area of Scotland.

History
Often affectionately referred to simply as "Nethy" the village has, since Victorian times been a tourist destination noted for its quiet and secluded location at the edge of the Abernethy Forest. It is in the heart of Strathspey in the Highlands of Scotland, between Aviemore and Grantown, and is within the boundary of the Cairngorms National Park which was established in 2003.

A primary industry of Nethy Bridge was forestry, with at one time several sawmills in the area, but this has long since subsided and now much of the income is derived from tourism.

The name is derived from the River Nethy, a tributary of the nearby Spey, which runs through the village, and the arched bridge which was built in 1810, to a classic Telford design, and is in the heart of the village. It had to be repaired after the Moray flood of August 1829, when part of it was washed away. In total, there are four Telford bridges in Nethy.

Originally called Abernethy, Nethy Bridge was renamed when the railways came this far north in the 1860s. The Great North of Scotland Railway already had a village called Abernethy on its line further south, so renamed this one Nethy Bridge to differentiate the two. The placename Abernethy is still frequently used around here: Abernethy Highland Games, Abernethy Forest, Abernethy Primary School etc.

Community and tourism
In 2011 the population of Nethy Bridge was 640.

Nethy Bridge was one of the first communities in the area to establish a tourist association website. A major part of the website is to record all properties with their individual history, and several village "elders" have been enlisted to research and record the facts.

In 2019, BBC Winterwatch was broadcast from the village.

References 

Populated places in Badenoch and Strathspey
Towns in Scotland
Villages in Highland (council area)
Villages in Scotland